Kroken Church is a parish church of the Church of Norway in Tromsø Municipality in Troms og Finnmark county, Norway. It is located the Kroken borough in the city of Tromsø. It is the church for the Kroken parish which is part of the Tromsø domprosti (arch-deanery) in the Diocese of Nord-Hålogaland. The brown, brick church was built in a fan-shaped style in 2006 using designs drawn up by the architect Nikolai Alfsen. The church seats about 600 people.

See also
List of churches in Nord-Hålogaland

References

Churches in Tromsø
Churches in Troms
Brick churches in Norway
21st-century Church of Norway church buildings
Churches completed in 2006
2006 establishments in Norway
Fan-shaped churches in Norway